Ağaçlı is a village in the Gerger District, Adıyaman Province, Turkey. The village is populated by Kurds of Dirêjan tribe and had a population of 351 in 2021.

References

Villages in Gerger District
Kurdish settlements in Adıyaman Province